Biston contectaria is a moth of the family Geometridae. It is found in China (Yunnan), India and Nepal.

References

Moths described in 1863
Bistonini